The Iloilo River is an estuary river located in the province of Iloilo, in Western Visayas, Philippines. The river starts in Oton at the Batiano estuary, then traverses through the Iloilo City districts of Lapuz, La Paz, Mandurriao, Molo, Arevalo and the City Proper, before emptying into the Iloilo Strait.

As an estuary, the river level fluctuates with the tides. This flow brings in nutrients from the sea, which makes the Iloilo River a nursery for fish species such as bangus and tilapia. The banks of the river are home to 22 of the country's 35 mangrove species, as well as the rare metapenaeus insolitus.

Wharf 

Iloilo River wharf, including Muelle Loney in the Iloilo City Proper, is a natural harbor which made it a preferred port of call for ships seeking protection from strong winds and tropical monsoons. It serves as port for inter island ferries that travel from Iloilo City to Bacolod on Negros and to Guimaras. It is also a drop-off point for fishing vessels that bring in their catch from the sea to be delivered to markets all over Iloilo.

Port

The Port of Iloilo was opened for international trade on 1855 and the coming of British Vice-consul Nicholas Loney, a year later, that led to the fast development of sugar industry in the region.

Esplanade
The Iloilo River Esplanade in Mandurriao district is a park development in one of its river banks constructed as a recreation area and an attraction for visitors.

Bridges
The bridges that cross the river include, into City Proper the Quirino-Lopez Bridge (built 1967, rehabilitated 2000) going to Lapuz district and Forbes (1910, rehabilitated 1975), Jalandoni and Drilon bridges going to La Paz district; and Diversion Bridge (1982) and Carpenters Bridge (2010, replacing a now-pedestrian only bridge) between Mandurriao and Molo districts.

See also 
 Iloilo River Esplanade
 Sibalom river

References 

Rivers of the Philippines
Landforms of Iloilo